San Pietro a Ovile is a medieval Roman Catholic church located in Via del Giglio in Siena, Region of Tuscany, Italy.

History
Originally built by the Franciscan order in the 13th century in Romanesque style, the church was attached to a hospice. The church underwent reconstruction in 1753-1758. Now only the façade, with its bells remain evident from the original church. The entrance portal has  deteriorated frescoes by Rutilio Manetti.

The church still houses frescoes of the Life of St Pietro by Apollonio Nasini, the son of Giuseppe Nicola, on the lateral walls, and an Annunciation attributed to Bartolo di Fredi in the apse. Other fragmentary frescoes in the apse are attributed to unknown 13th century painter(s). The inventory of 1840 by Romganoli lists a Glory of St Joseph (1634) attributed to Simondio Salimbeni.

Sources
Translated from Italian Wikipedia

Pietro a Ovile
Pietro a Ovile
13th-century Roman Catholic church buildings in Italy
18th-century Roman Catholic church buildings in Italy